The H-101 Salto ('Loop') is an aerobatic glider of glass composite construction, developed in Germany in the 1970s. Based on the Standard Libelle H-201, it was designed by Ursula Hänle, widow of Eugen Hänle, former Director of Glasflügel. It was first produced by Start + Flug GmbH Saulgau.

Design and development
The H-101 differs from the Libelle in having a V-tail, showing its ancestry to the V-tailed Hütter H-30 GFK. Four flush-fitting air brakes were fitted to the trailing edges of the wings, replacing the more conventionally sited air brakes of the Standard Libelle. The Salto's air brakes are hinged at their midpoints so that half the surface projects above the wing and half below.

The Salto prototype first flew on 6 March 1970, and 67 had been delivered by early 1977, when production at Start + Flug GmbH Saulgau ceased. Five more Saltos were built from 1993 to 1996 by the German company "LTB Frank & Waldenberger", bringing total output of Salto gliders to 72.

The Salto was again made available in the late 1980s by Doktor Fiberglas, set up by Ursula Hänle at Westerburg in West Germany as the Hänle H 101 Salto, available in utility and aerobatic versions, with the Utility version available with either short or long-span wings.

Specifications (H 101 Aerobatic)

See also

References

Notes

Further reading

External links

http://www.frankundwaldenberger.de/index.php?firmengeschichte (History of the Frank & Waldenberger company)
https://www.easa.europa.eu/sites/default/files/dfu/EASA.SAS.A.028_Haenle_H101_Salto_issue01.pdf

1970s German sailplanes
Glasflügel aircraft
V-tail aircraft
Aircraft first flown in 1970